Elagh More (from Irish: Aileach Mór, meaning 'stony place') is a townland in County Londonderry, Northern Ireland and lies between Ballynagalliagh and the border with County Donegal in the Republic of Ireland, on the outskirts of Derry. It is within Derry City and Strabane district.

Elagh More is referred to in Annals of the Four Masters as "tighearna Ailigh do mharbhadh la hUa mBreasail". In the Irish patent rolls of James I, the townland is referred to as Allaghderrie. Later in the century, the manor of Elagh was held by the Benson family, who also founded the town of Stranorlar in County Donegal.

References

Townlands of County Londonderry
Derry and Strabane district